The 2017–18 BC Prienai season is the 23rd season in the existence of the club, which was known as Vytautas Prienai–Birštonas for sponsorship reasons (which was their last year under that name). The team played in the Lithuanian Basketball League (LKL) but also briefly participated in the Baltic Basketball League (BBL) and in the qualifying round of Basketball Champions League (BCL). The season was highlighted with both on-court and financial struggles, dating as far back as 2016, and several roster changes.

The team, in December 2017, most notably signed American brothers LaMelo and LiAngelo Ball, who had drawn international attention in the years prior. Following the brothers' arrival, Vytautas withdrew from the BBL and announced Big Baller Brand, a sports apparel company owned by LaVar Ball, as its sponsor. After the Ball brothers joined the team in January 2018, Vytautas took part in several exhibition games, including the Big Baller Brand Challenge Games and the Big Baller Brand International Tournament. Upon signing the Ball brothers, the team gained significant popularity, especially in the United States. However, both Ball brothers would not stay with the squad near the end of the season, thus leaving them with the threat of relegation.

Overview 
Vytautas started the 2017–18 season badly by failing to qualify for the 2017–18 Basketball Champions League season. The team was also performing poorly in the national competition and saw decreasing popularity among fans. Additionally, Vytautas faced major financial struggles, failing to fully pay many former players. Towards the beginning of the season, the team controversially signed businessman Tomas Tumynas, who had no prior professional basketball experience. According to head coach Virginijus Šeškus, Tumynas helped Vytautas financially, despite not playing any games before his release in January 2018. The team lost to Lietuvos rytas Vilnius on 6 January 2018 by a margin of 113–56 for its worst defeat of the season. After the game, Vytautas dropped to last place in their league.

On 11 December 2017, Vytautas signed LiAngelo and LaMelo Ball, the younger brothers of Los Angeles Lakers player Lonzo Ball, both of whom agreed to join the team in the beginning of January 2018. Both brothers, along with Lonzo, had gained fame in the United States after leading Chino Hills High School to an undefeated season and mythical national championship in 2015–16. LiAngelo drew the international spotlight in November 2017 after being arrested for shoplifting in China, abruptly ending his college basketball career at UCLA and culminating in a Twitter-based feud between his father LaVar Ball and U.S. President Donald Trump. The Lithuanian team, whose managers described the signing as an instant success, subsequently received international attention and being featured in The New York Times. Upon the Ball brothers' arrival, the Lithuanian Basketball League (LKL) rescheduled Vytautas' games against Pieno žvaigždės Pasvalys and Juventus Utena to better suit their American audience.

In early January 2018, Vytautas pulled out of the Baltic Basketball League season, instead setting up and hosting the Big Baller Brand Challenge Games, a series of exhibition games mostly against opponents from lower Lithuanian leagues. On 23 January 2018, the team announced that the sports apparel company Big Baller Brand would be an official sponsor until the end of the season. LaVar Ball, owner of the company, was appointed as assistant coach for a match-up with Dzūkija Alytus and then as head coach against Jonava. Ball and his family helped the team pay off the club's debts, contributing €100,000.

By the end of February, Vytautas announced that it would play in another exhibition event sponsored by the company, known the Big Baller Brand International Tournament, a round-robin competition featuring three European teams outside of Lithuania. LaVar Ball continued to serve as head coach. In late March and early April, Vytautas participated in two more friendlies, hosting a game against a youth squad of the Chinese team Guangdong Southern Tigers and facing the London Lions of the British Basketball League (BBL) in London. However, after the end of the team's exhibition games, head coach Virginijus Šeškus would make some drastic changes for the team to avoid the threat of relegation, most notably by sitting LaMelo Ball throughout the rest of the regular season. Since the changes, Vytautas would go on a three-game winning streak, with the threat of being relegated looking dimmer and dimmer in the process. However, after a 73–69 loss to Siauliai on April 25, LaVar Ball announced he would pull his sons out of the team after neither Ball player played that night. After losing that night, Vytautas would lose their last three games of the season, with the team letting go of Kervin Bristol, Rashaun Broadus, and Denys Lukashov before the end of their last game that season. As a result, their season left them with the threat of relegating to the NKL, with Vytis Šakiai looking for its promotion this season. Ultimately, while Vytautas finished the season in last place, they would survive the threat of relegation this season due to Vytis not meeting the proper promotion requirements this year.

Players

Squad information

Depth chart

Players In

Players Out

Notes:
 1 Sign and trade. Didn't play a single regular season game.

Club

Technical staff

Kit

Supplier: AGO
Main sponsors: Big Baller Brand, Skycop.com

Back sponsors: ADMA, Ekofrisa
Short sponsors: SIL, Perlas

Friendlies

Big Baller Brand Challenge Games

Big Baller Brand International Tournament

Other friendlies

Competitions

Overall

Overview

Lithuanian Basketball League

League table

Matches

Baltic Basketball League 
Vytautas forfeited a game on October 31, 2017 against Rapla after head coach Virginijus Šeškus received a second technical foul with three minutes left in regulation and refused to let his team continue playing. The Baltic Basketball League assessed Vytautas with a technical loss of 20–0 and fined the team €3,000. On January 6, 2018, after playing six games in the BBL, Vytautas withdrew from the 2017–18 season. In its place, the team set up the Big Baller Brand Challenge Games, a series of five friendly games that were designed to feature LaMelo and LiAngelo Ball in their professional debuts. However, Vytautas were assessed a €5,000 fine for forfeiting a non-televised game against Tsmoki-Minsk and were disqualified from the BBL, with the results of previous games being nullified, for their second forfeit of the season.

Matches

Basketball Champions League

Qualification

Individual awards

Lithuanian Basketball League 
Player of the Week

References

External links
 BC Vytautas official website 
 Club info at the LKL official site
 Club info at the Basketball Champions League official site

2017–18 in European basketball by club
2017–18 in Lithuanian basketball